Vladimer Chanturia (born July 1, 1978) is a Georgian boxer who competed in the Heavyweight (91 kg) division at the 2000 Summer Olympics and won the bronze medal.

Amateur highlights 
1996 competed at the 1996 Junior World Championships in Havana, Cuba as a Light Heavyweight. Result was:
Lost to Khodor Zaher RSC-3
2000 won the bronze medal at the 2000 Olympics in Sydney as a Heavyweight. Results were:
Defeated Mustafa Mahmoud Amrou (Egypt) RSCI-4
Defeated Ruslan Chagaev (Uzbekistan) PTS (18-12)
Lost to Sultan Ibragimov (Russia) PTS (4-19)

Pro career
Chanturia turned pro in 2006 and won his first nine bouts against countrymen but showed only limited power.

Mixed Martial Arts
Chanturia was defeated by Alistair Overeem in Fighting Network Rings, his only MMA bout.

External links
 
 
 
 

1978 births
Living people
Male boxers from Georgia (country)
Heavyweight boxers
Heavyweight mixed martial artists
Olympic boxers of Georgia (country)
Boxers at the 2000 Summer Olympics
Olympic bronze medalists for Georgia (country)
Olympic medalists in boxing
Medalists at the 2000 Summer Olympics